Feiping Chang is a Taiwanese socialite, blogger, and fashion influencer based in Hong Kong.

Early life 
Feiping Chang was born in Taipei and grew up in Sydney and Singapore before settling in Hong Kong. She graduated from New York University's Stern School of Business.

Career 
Chang worked in finance and banking in Hong Kong before launching her lifestyle blog, xoxoFei.com. She has gained notability for her lifestyle as a socialite in Hong Kong.

Personal life 
In 2014, Chang met financier Lincoln Li through mutual friend Ivan Pun while they were in Myanmar. Two years later, Li proposed to Chang at the Huka Lodge in Taupo. The couple were married legally in April 2017, but had their wedding festivities in June 2017. Their wedding festivities lasted three days, starting with a dinner in Capri on June 15. On June 17 the couple's wedding ceremony took place at Villa Lysis. The Italian government had never permitted a wedding to take place at Villa Lysis, making Chang and Li the first two people to wed there. The government agreed to the ceremony at Villa Lysis after Chang and Li offered to refurbish it prior to their ceremony.

References

External links
 

Living people
Hong Kong socialites
Chinese bloggers
Chinese women bloggers
Singaporean bloggers
Singaporean women bloggers
Fashion influencers
New York University Stern School of Business alumni
Year of birth missing (living people)